Xu Zhongyu (15 February 1915 – 25 June 2019) was a Chinese writer and literary scholar who served as Professor and Chair of the Department of Chinese of East China Normal University. His book University Chinese has been the standard textbook in Chinese universities for almost forty years, with 30 million copies printed as of 2019.

Biography 
Xu Zhongyu was born on 15 February 1915 in Jiangyin, Jiangsu, Republic of China. He graduated from the Department of Chinese of National Central University in 1939, and the graduate school of Sun Yat-sen University in 1941.

In 1952, Xu became a professor in the Department of Chinese of East China Normal University in Shanghai. After the Cultural Revolution, Xu was appointed Chair of the Department of Chinese. He oversaw the compilation of the textbook University Chinese, published in 1981. It has become the standard textbook in Chinese universities, and by the time of his death in 2019, 30 million copies of the book had been printed.

As the Chair of Chinese at East China Normal University, Xu encouraged students to engage in creative writing and publishing. He initiated the reform that allowed students of the Chinese Department to submit their literary works as an alternative to the required graduation thesis. This made the university a hotbed of Chinese literature. A number of Xu's students became well known writers, including , Sun Yong 孙颙, Nan Fan 南帆, Wang Xiaoying 王小鹰, Chen Danyan, Mao Shi'an 毛时安, and Chen Bohai 陈伯海. Zhao submitted his poetry collection as his graduation work, while Sun published Winter, one of the first major novels in the post-Cultural Revolution era, and Nan had his university homework published in one of the literary journals that Xu edited.

Xu's major works include Exploring the Heritage of Lu Xun and A Treatise on the Creation of Ancient Literature and Art. In December 2014, Xu received the Lifetime Achievement Award of the 6th Shanghai Literature and Arts Awards. When he was 100, he donated his savings of 1 million yuan to establish a scholarship at East China Normal University, as well as his collection of 50,000 books.

Xu died on 25 June 2019 at Huadong Hospital in Shanghai, at the age of 104.

References 

1915 births
2019 deaths
Chinese literary critics
Educators from Wuxi
People from Jiangyin
Writers from Wuxi
National Central University alumni
Sun Yat-sen University alumni
Academic staff of the East China Normal University
Chinese centenarians
Men centenarians